Kiowa Creek may refer to:

 Kiowa Creek (Colorado)
 Kiowa Creek (Kansas)
 Kiowa Creek (Texas/Oklahoma)